Alberto Fiumicetti (born 13 July 2000) is an Italian football player.

Club career

Verona
He is the product of Verona youth teams and played for their Under-19 squad. He has not received any call-ups to the senior squad by the end of the 2018–19 season.

Loan to Fermana
On 26 July 2019 he joined Serie C club Fermana on loan.

He made his professional Serie C debut for Fermana on 25 August 2019 in a game against Ravenna. He substituted Luca Cognigni in the 82nd minute.

On 13 January 2020, Fermana terminated the loan early. He ended the loan with 3 league appearances, all as a substitute.

Loan to Mantova
On 14 January 2020 he was loaned to Serie D club Mantova.

References

External links
 

2000 births
Sportspeople from the Province of Verona
Footballers from Veneto
Living people
Italian footballers
Association football forwards
Fermana F.C. players
Mantova 1911 players
Serie C players
21st-century Italian people